Ruad may refer to:
 Arwad, a small waterless island off the coast of Tortosa, Syria
 Fall of Ruad, battle around 1302 between the Egyptian Mamluks and the Crusaders
 Áed Rúad, High King of medieval Irish legend
 Ruad, Old Irish term for red, as in Red Branch
 Ruad, a Celtic goddess, rescued by the dwarf poet Abcán